High Island may refer to:

High Island (Alaska), USA
High Island, Texas, USA, a community
High Island (Michigan), USA
High Island, Michigan, former community
High Island (New York), USA
High Island (Hong Kong) (Leung Shuen Wan), Sai Kung District, New Territories
High Island (Queensland), Australia
High Island (Maryland), an island in Maryland, USA
High Island (Rhode River), an island in Maryland, USA
High Island in Torres Strait, Queensland, Australia
High Island, one of the Thimble Islands in Connecticut, USA
Ardoileán or High Island, Ireland
East Wallabi Island, usually referred to as "High Island" in the context of the Batavia shipwreck

See also
high island, a geological term describing an island of volcanic origin